Meshcheryakov or Mescheryakov is a Russian masculine surname, its feminine counterpart is Meshcheryakova or Mescheryakova. It may refer to:

Andrei Meshcheryakov (footballer) (born 1984), Russian football player
Andrei Meshcheryakov (swimmer) (born 1994), Russian swimmer
Natalya Meshcheryakova (born 1972), Russian swimmer 
Yuriy Meshcheryakov (1946–2001), Soviet, Russian and Ukrainian animator

Russian-language surnames